Podi Wije was a notorious gang robber from Polonnaruwa.

He terrorised the North Central Province in Sri Lanka for several months before being shot dead in a jungle five miles off a Minneriya rice mill.

His legacy includes a song bearing his name written and performed by Anton Jones and the 1988 film Podi Wije.

References

1954 deaths
Sri Lankan gangsters
Year of birth missing